Roy Daniel Moore (October 26, 1898 in Austin, Texas – April 5, 1951 in Seattle, Washington) was a pitcher in Major League Baseball.

Teams
 Philadelphia Athletics 1920-1922 (start)
 Detroit Tigers 1922 (end) - 1923

External links

1898 births
1951 deaths
Baseball players from Austin, Texas
Major League Baseball pitchers
Philadelphia Athletics players
Detroit Tigers players